The 2020–21 Gamma Ethniki was the 38th season since the official establishment of the championship in 1983, but the 2nd season as the fourth tier of the Greek Football. It started on 11 October 2020 but put on hold from the Greek government due to the COVID-19 pandemic on 1 November 2020. It restarted on 11 April 2021, with the group stage being completed after its first round. The champions of each group then qualified for a playoff round, to determine which four teams would be promoted to 2021–22 Super League 2.

136 teams were divided into ten groups according to geographical criteria.

Doxa Kato Kamila, Souli Paramythia, Thinaliakos, AO Anatoli, PAS Kithairon Kaparelli, Sparti and Panakrotiriakos withdrew from the league before the group draw.

Group 1

Teams

Standings

Group 2

Teams

Standings

Group 3

Teams

Standings

Group 4

Teams

Standings

Group 5

Teams

Standings

Group 6

Teams

Standings

Group 7

Teams

Standings

Group 8

Teams

Standings

Group 9

Teams

Standings

Group 10

Teams

Standings

Promotion Playoffs

Group 1

The five champion teams from first 5 groups will meet once (4 matches per team) for two places in Super League 2. 
<onlyinclude>

Group 2

The five champion teams from group 6 to 10 will meet once (4 matches per team) for two places in Super League 2.

References

Fourth level Greek football league seasons
4
Greece
Greece 4